Nadia Röthlisberger-Raspe (30 June 1972 – 9 February 2015) was a Swiss curler and Olympic medalist. She received a silver medal at the 2002 Winter Olympics in Salt Lake City.

References

External links
 

1972 births
2015 deaths
Swiss female curlers
Olympic curlers of Switzerland
Curlers at the 2002 Winter Olympics
Olympic silver medalists for Switzerland
Olympic medalists in curling
Medalists at the 2002 Winter Olympics
Continental Cup of Curling participants
Deaths from cancer in Switzerland
21st-century Swiss women